Eucithara marerosa is a small sea snail, a marine gastropod mollusk in the family Mangeliidae.

Description
The length of the shell attains 9.9 mm; its diameter 4.1 mm

Distribution
This marine species occurs off Southern KwaZulu-Natal and Eastern Transkei, South Africa

References

 Kilburn R.N. 1992. Turridae (Mollusca: Gastropoda) of southern Africa and Mozambique. Part 6. Subfamily Mangeliinae, section 1. Annals of the Natal Museum, 33: 461–575

External links
 

Endemic fauna of South Africa
marerosa
Gastropods described in 1992